Preston Webb Slack (December 28, 1908 – January 25, 1993) was an American professional basketball player. He played in the National Basketball League for the Fort Wayne General Electrics in 1937–38 and the Sheboygan Red Skins in 1938–39. In his 23-game NBL career, Slack averaged 4.3 points per game.

References

1908 births
1993 deaths
American men's basketball players
Basketball players from Wisconsin
Basketball players from Fort Wayne, Indiana
Centers (basketball)
Fort Wayne General Electrics players
Forwards (basketball)
Sheboygan Red Skins players